Harald Torsten Leonard Nilsson (1 April 1905 – 14 December 1997) was a Swedish Social Democratic politician. He served as Minister of Defence from 1951 to 1957, and as Minister for Foreign Affairs from 1962 to 1971. Nilsson also served as Minister for Social Affairs and Minister of Communications (Transport). He was awarded the Illis quorum by the Swedish government in 1984.

References 

1905 births
1997 deaths
Swedish Social Democratic Party politicians
Swedish Ministers for Foreign Affairs
Swedish Ministers for Social Affairs
Swedish Ministers for Communications
Nuclear weapons programme of Sweden
Swedish Ministers for Defence
Recipients of the Illis quorum